Arthur Robin (born 5 February 1927) is a Guadeloupean-born French former professional bodybuilder.  He won the 1957 Mr. Universe championship. He was the first Black winner of the competition.

In film
Robin played himself in the 2016 Austrian-Italian fictional film Mister Universo, in which a circus liontamer goes searching for Robin. The film was shown at the 2016 Vienna International Film Festival.

References

Guadeloupean male bodybuilders
Professional bodybuilders
1927 births
Living people
People associated with physical culture

Black French sportspeople